Donald J. Knapp (born March 20, 1932) was an American politician in the state of Iowa.

Knapp was born in Monticello, Iowa. He attended Kirkwood Community College and the University of Iowa and worked in corrections. He served in the Iowa House of Representatives from 1981 to 1993, as a Democrat.

References

1932 births
People from Monticello, Iowa
Living people
Democratic Party members of the Iowa House of Representatives
University of Iowa alumni